Stained Glass Morning is the second and last album by Scott McKenzie, released in 1970. It is notable for the work of "sterling backup players, including Ry Cooder, Rusty Young (of Poco), and Barry McGuire." The album did not chart on the Billboard 200.

One single was released off the album, "Going Home Again", but it did not chart.

Track listing 
All songs written by Scott McKenzie.
 "Look in the Mirror" – 3:37
 "Yves" – 4:35
 "Crazy Man" – 4:18
 "1969" – 3:00
 "Dear Sister" – 5:19
 "Going Home Again" – 3:37
 "Stained Glass Morning" – 4:57
 "Illusion" – 4:49
 "Take a Moment" – 5:38

Personnel 
 Scott McKenzie – vocals, 12-string guitar, electric piano
 Ry Cooder – electric and acoustic bottleneck
 Rusty Young – pedal steel guitar
 Barry McGuire – harmonica
Colin Cameron, Max Bennett - bass
Chuck Domanico - acoustic bass
Craig Doerge - piano, organ, harpsichord, electric piano 
Walter Foutz - organ
Mac Elsensohn - drums
Bunk Gardner - saxophone
Edgar Lustgarten - cello
Brooks Hunnicutt, David Mani, Dorothy Durr, Girls of Pittsburgh Manor, Jeffrey Thomas, Julia Tillman Waters, Lorna Willard, Robert Markland - backing vocals

Technical 

Bart Chiate, David Anderle, Henry Lewy - engineer

References

1970 albums
Albums produced by David Anderle
Ode Records albums